Luján, Luxan or Luhan, a Spanish surname and given name, might refer to:

Tony Lujan
Jazz musician.Composer
Artist
Trumpet And Flughelhorn
Born 1956 Albuquerque NM.
World Renowned. 
Extensive Resume.
N M Music Hall Of Fame 2020
Over 500 Recording
Motion pictures as well.

People

Politics
The Lujan political family of New Mexico:
Manuel Lujan Sr., former Republican Mayor of Santa Fe
Manuel Lujan Jr. (1928–2019), former Republican U.S. Secretary of the Interior and Representative from New Mexico; son of Manuel, Sr.
Ben Luján, former Democratic Speaker of the New Mexico House of Representatives; nephew of Manuel, Jr.
Ben Ray Luján, Democratic U.S. Senator from New Mexico; son of Ben
Michelle Lujan Grisham, Democratic Governor of New Mexico; distantly related to the above
John Lujan, former Republican member of the Texas House of Representatives
Gabriel Silva Luján, Colombian diplomat
Pilar C. Lujan, Guamanian politician

Sport
Andrés Iniesta Luján, footballer for FC Barcelona and the Spain national football team
Micaela Luján, Argentina professional boxer
Sebastian Andres Lujan, Argentine professional boxer
Walter Samuel (born Walter Adrián Luján, 1978), Argentine footballer

Other fields
Luján Fernández, Argentine supermodel
Daniela Luján, Mexican actress
Fernando Luján, Mexican actor
Mabel Dodge Luhan and Tony Luhan, American patrons of the arts

Places

Luján, Buenos Aires, the head city in the district with the same name in Buenos Aires province, Argentina
Luján de Cuyo, the head city and district in Mendoza province, Argentina
Luján Partido, the district in Buenos Aires province, Argentina
Luján River, in Buenos Aires Province, Argentina
 Luhan River in Ukraine
 Luhansk city in Ukraine

Religion
Our Lady of Luján, a title of the Virgin Mary in Argentina
Basilica of Our Lady of Luján, a Roman Catholic shrine in Luján, Buenos Aires Province, Argentina
Cathedral Basilica of Mercedes-Luján, a Roman Catholic cathedral in Mercedes, Buenos Aires Province, Argentina
Cathedral of Our Lady of Luján, Río Gallegos, a Roman Catholic cathedral in Río Gallegos, Santa Cruz Province, Argentina
Chapel of the Miracle of Our Lady of Luján, a pilgrimage site in Zelaya, Buenos Aires Province, Argentina
Chapel of Our Lady of Sorrows of Luján Pérez, a side chapel in the Cathedral of Santa Ana, Canary Islands, Spain

Other uses
Lujan v. Defenders of Wildlife, a United States Supreme Court case
Asociación Atlética Luján de Cuyo, an Argentine football team